BBC Radio Oxford is the BBC's local radio station serving the county of Oxfordshire.

It broadcasts on FM, DAB, digital TV and via BBC Sounds from studios in the Summertown area of Oxford.

According to RAJAR, the station has a weekly audience of 79,000 listeners and a 5.4% share as of December 2022.

History

Early 1970 – Oxford was chosen as a location for BBC local radio and premises in Summertown found at 242-254 Banbury Road. The site is known as Barclay House and was previously a Rolls-Royce showroom.
Mid 1970: Staff were recruited, a small number with BBC experience but mostly local people, and the studios at Summertown are built.
September 1970 – On air staff trained at The Langham Hotel in London
Early October 1970 – Three weeks of test transmissions begin.
29 October 1970 – BBC Radio Oxford officially begins transmission at 5pm on 95.0 MHz VHF.
31 December 1970 – Radio Times lists BBC Radio Oxford programmes for the first time.
5 October 1972 – Due to high demand by residents who did not have VHF/FM on their radios, BBC Radio Oxford begins broadcasting on 202 metres medium wave (1484 kHz). The station would also be available on the local cable network on 'Rediffusion Channel A'.
26 June 1973 – BBC Radio Oxford moves its VHF frequency to 95.2 MHz to avoid interference with BBC Radio London on 94.9 MHz.
22 May 1976 – The station opens its studios to the public for an open weekend.
October 1980 – BBC Radio Oxford celebrates 10 years on air by publishing a magazine.
April/May 1989 – BBC Radio Oxford moves to purpose built studios at 269 Banbury Road, Summertown.
9 April 1996 – Radio Oxford merges with BBC Radio Berkshire to form the short-lived BBC Thames Valley FM.  Local programming is restricted to separate news bulletins for the two counties.
14 February 2000 – Radio Oxford is revived, although most output continues to be shared with Radio Berkshire.
2004 – BBC Radio Oxford relaunches with a new line-up of presenters. By now, the station has regained a full line-up of local programming.
April 2008 – The station is rebranded as BBC Oxford 95.2FM as part of a relaunch involving the regional TV news programme BBC Oxford News (previously South Today Oxford).
October 2010 – The station celebrates its 40th anniversary and reverts to the Radio Oxford branding.
21 December 2012 – BBC Radio Oxford's DAB service is launched.

Programming
Local programming is produced and broadcast from the BBC's Oxford studios from 6am – 10pm on weekdays, from 6am – 6pm and 8-9pm on Saturdays and from 6am – 6pm and 10pm – 1am on Sundays.

Off-peak programming, including the late show from 10pm – 1am, originates from BBC Radio Solent in Southampton and BBC Radio Berkshire in Reading.

During the station's downtime, BBC Radio Oxford simulcasts overnight programming from BBC Radio 5 Live and BBC Radio London.

Presenters

Notable current presenters include:

Tony Blackburn (Sunday evenings)
David Prever (weekday breakfast)
Bill Rennells (Harmony Night)

Notable past presenters 

 Richard Allinson (now on Greatest Hits Radio and Scala Radio)
 Malcolm Boyden (departed October 2014 to return to BBC Hereford & Worcester after leaving the station in 2008)
 Jon Briggs (original UK voice of Apple's Siri)
 Humphrey Carpenter (died 2005)
 Anne Diamond 
 Mike Dickin (died 2006)
 Will Gompertz
 Jonathan Hancock
 Bob Harris (now on BBC Radio 2)
 Bill Heine (died 2019)

 Alex Lester (now on Greatest Hits Radio)
 Timmy Mallett
 Andrew Peach (now on BBC Radio 4 and BBC Radio Berkshire) 
 Libby Purves (later at BBC Radio 4, now on Times Radio)
 Alan Roberts
 Sybil Ruscoe
 Martin Stanford (formerly of Sky News, now at LBC News)
 Tim Smith (later at BBC Radio 2)

See also 
 Oxford University Broadcasting Society (former producer of BBC Oxford programmes)

References

External links 
 BBC Radio Oxford
 BBC Oxford
 Media UK – BBC Radio Oxford

Radio stations established in 1970
Oxford
Radio stations in Oxfordshire
Mass media in Oxford
Mass media in Oxfordshire
1970 establishments in England